The Institut de la statistique du Québec (or Quebec Statistical Institute in translation) is the governmental statistics agency of Quebec.  It is responsible for producing, analyzing, and publishing official statistics to enhance knowledge, discussion and decision-making. The 1998 law that established it (with effect on April 1, 1999) states that it can also be referred to as Statistique Québec.

It is part of the Ministry of Finance of Quebec.

It grouped together four previous entities: the Bureau de la statistique du Québec, the Institut de recherche et d'information sur la rémunération, Santé Québec, and the personnel of the Ministry of Labour who were responsible for compiling salary information.

See also 
 Sub-national autonomous statistical services
 United Nations Statistics Division

References

External links
 Official website
 Text of the establishing law 

Quebec government departments and agencies
Government agencies established in 1999
Quebec
1999 establishments in Quebec